William "Liam" Donnelly (1928– 5 January 2017) was an Irish former hurler who played as a centre-back for the Dublin senior team.

Raised in Raheny, Dublin, Donnelly played both hurling and Gaelic football with his local club, St Vincents. As a minor, he scored the winning goal against Tipperary in the 1946 All-Ireland Minor Hurling Championship final. He won a Leinster Senior Hurling Championship with the Dublin senior team in 1948 and featured in the 1948 All-Ireland final, which they lost to Waterford.

Outside of sport, Donnelly served as an officer in the Irish Army, and was "third in command" (Support Platoon Commander) of A Company during the Siege of Jadotville in 1961.

Honours

Dublin

All-Ireland Senior Hurling Championship
Runner-up (1): 1948
Leinster Senior Hurling Championship
Winner (1): 1948
All-Ireland Minor Hurling Championship
Winner (2): 1945, 1946
Leinster Minor Hurling Championship
Winner (2): 1945, 1946

References

1928 births
People from Raheny
People educated at St. Joseph's CBS, Fairview
Sportspeople from Dublin (city)
Dublin inter-county hurlers
St Vincents (Dublin) hurlers
St Vincents (Dublin) Gaelic footballers
Dual players
2017 deaths